The office of the Moderator of the General Assembly was the highest elected position in the United Presbyterian Church in the United States of America (UPCUSA).  The Moderator was responsible for presiding over the meeting of the General Assembly, which was held annually between 1958 and 1983.  After the meeting, which lasted for about a week, the Moderator served as an ambassador of the denomination throughout the remainder of the term.  After completing the term, most former Moderators took on the role of a church statesman.

The chart below shows the Moderators, and the place of meetings, from 1958 when the UPCUSA was formed by the union of the Presbyterian Church in the United States of America with the United Presbyterians of North America, until 1983 when the UPCUSA merged with the Presbyterian Church in the United States to form the present day Presbyterian Church (USA).

Moderators of UPCUSA General Assemblies

See also
List of Moderators of the General Assembly of the Presbyterian Church (USA)

References

Presbyterianism in the United States
American Christian clergy
Moderators